2018 Tochigi SC season.

League table

Squad
As of 1 July 2019.

Out on loan

J2 League
Data source: J.League

References

External links
 J.League official site

Tochigi SC
Tochigi SC seasons